Moreau Township is an inactive township in Cole County, in the U.S. state of Missouri.

Moreau Township was established in 1821, taking its name from the river of the same name within its borders.

References

Townships in Missouri
Townships in Cole County, Missouri
Jefferson City metropolitan area